Jay de la Cueva is a Mexican model, actor, producer, singer, bassist, drummer, guitarist, pianist and songwriter. He currently fronts Moderatto. His first musical experience was as a kid with the rock band Microchips, in which he was the bass player. 
He later joined rock bands Victimas del Dr. Cerebro and Titán. He was also a co-founder of the band Molotov. In 1995, he left Molotov to join the band Fobia.

Bands
 Micro Chips – bass
 Victimas del Dr. Cerebro – drums
 Fobia – drums, bass
 Molotov – bass
 Titán – bass
 Moderatto – lead singer, guitar, piano
 Mexrrissey – guitar, bass, vocals

References 

1978 births
Living people
Mexican musicians
Musicians from Mexico City
21st-century Mexican singers